Marja-Liisa Orvokki Vartio (née Sairanen, 1955-1966 Haavikko; 11 September 1924 Sääminki, Finland  – 17 June 1966 Savonlinna, Finland) was a Finnish poet and prose writer. Her writing career was short but influential. She was one of the leading modernist writers in Finland.

She studied art history and modern literature in University of Helsinki. She married an art dealer in 1945 and was introduced into Helsinki's writing and artistic circles. Her first collection s of poetry were published in 1952. In 1955 she married writer Paavo Haavikko. Around that time she started to write prose. Her prose is what she is most remembered for. Her work deals with dreams, fantasy and myth, and avoids personal comments and explanations.

Vartio published nine works of prose and poetry. Her works describe how the world changed in the twentieth century and the influence of this on human beings, especially on women. In her poetry she used folk literature as an inspiration.  One of her novels, Hänen olivat linnut (The Parson's Widow) was published after her death. It tells about an old woman and her maid.  The novel is considered Vartio's most central work.

References

External links 
  The Parson’s Widow Schwob

1924 births
1966 deaths
People from Savonlinna
Finnish-language poets
Finnish-language writers
Writers from South Savo
20th-century Finnish poets
20th-century Finnish novelists
Finnish women poets
20th-century women writers
Thanks for the Book Award winners